Pelecotoma is a genus of wedge-shaped beetles in the family Ripiphoridae. There are at least three described species in Pelecotoma.

Species
These three species belong to the genus Pelecotoma:
 Pelecotoma fennica (Paykull, 1799)
 Pelecotoma flavipes Melsheimer, 1846
 Pelecotoma septentrionalis Kono, 1936

References

Further reading

 
 

Ripiphoridae
Articles created by Qbugbot